Jhanwar is a village and a newly made tehsil in the Jodhpur district of Rajasthan, India.

References

Villages in Jodhpur district